Richard Montague Stephens Eyre (16 May 1929 – 12 December 2012) was an Anglican priest.  He was the Dean of Exeter from 1981 to 1995.

Eyre was educated at Charterhouse School and Oriel College, Oxford. He was ordained as an Anglican priest in 1957  and began his ministry as a curate at St Mark's Portsea, Portsmouth. After this, he was a tutor at Chichester Theological College then a chaplain at Eastbourne College. From 1965 to 1973, he was the Vicar of Arundel and from 1975 to 1981, the Archdeacon of Chichester, before his appointment as the Dean of Exeter.

References

1929 births

2012 deaths

Archdeacons of Chichester
Deans of Exeter
British Anglo-Catholics
Anglo-Catholic clergy

People educated at Charterhouse School
Alumni of Oriel College, Oxford